P121 may refer to:
 
 Papyrus 121, a biblical manuscript
 Saunders-Roe P.121 Hydroski, a British naval fighter design study
 , a patrol boat of the Turkish Navy
 P121, a state regional road in Latvia